Steeg is a municipality in the district of Reutte in the Austrian state of Tyrol.

Geography
Steeg lies on the border to the state of Vorarlberg at the western edge of Tyrol.

References

Cities and towns in Reutte District